Ramnagar Assembly constituency is one of the 87 constituencies in the Jammu and Kashmir Legislative Assembly of Jammu and Kashmir a north state of India. Ramnagar is also part of Udhampur Lok Sabha constituency.

Member of Legislative Assembly

 1962: Hem Raj, Jammu and Kashmir National Conference
 1967: Chandu Lal, Indian National Congress
 1972: Chandu Lal, Indian National Congress
 1977: Prithvi Chand, Bharatiya Janata Party
 1983: Ram Dass, Indian National Congress
 1987: Chandu Lal, Indian National Congress
 1996: Harsh Dev Singh, Jammu & Kashmir Panthers Party
 2002: Harsh Dev Singh, Jammu and Kashmir National Panthers Party
 2008: Harsh Dev Singh, Jammu and Kashmir National Panthers Party

Election results

2014

See also
 Ramnagar
 Udhampur district
 List of constituencies of Jammu and Kashmir Legislative Assembly

References

Assembly constituencies of Jammu and Kashmir
Udhampur district